The 1998 Philippine Basketball Association (PBA) Centennial All-Filipino Cup, also known as the 1998 McDonald's-PBA All-Filipino Cup for sponsorship reasons, was the first conference of the 1998 PBA season. It started on February 1 and ended on May 8, 1998. The tournament is an All-Filipino format, which doesn't require an import or a pure-foreign player for each team.

Format
The following format will be observed for the duration of the conference:
The teams were divided into 2 groups.

Group A:
Alaska Milkmen
Gordon's Gin Boars
Formula Shell
San Miguel Beermen

Group B:
Mobiline Phone Pals
Sta. Lucia Realtors
Purefoods Carne Norte Beefies
Pop Cola 800s

Teams in a group will play against each other once and against teams in the other group twice; 11 games per team; Teams are then seeded by basis on win–loss records. Ties are broken among point differentials of the tied teams. Standings will be determined in one league table; teams do not qualify by basis of groupings.
The top six teams after the eliminations will advance to the semifinals.
Semifinals will be two round robin affairs with the remaining teams. Results from the elimination round will be carried over. A playoff incentive for a finals berth will be given to the team that will win at least seven of their ten semifinal games.
The top two teams (or the top team and the winner of the playoff incentive) will face each other in a best-of-seven championship series. The next two teams will qualify for a one-game playoff for third place.

Elimination round

Team standings

Semifinals

Team standings

Cumulative standings

Semifinal round standings:

Finals berth playoff

Third place playoff

Finals

References

PBA Philippine Cup
All-Filipino Cup